Billy White (born January 26, 1989) is an American  professional basketball player. He competed with San Diego State at the college level. After graduating, White joined the NBA D-League and then played for multiple international clubs. He has played for the Halifax Hurricanes and Moncton Magic of the National Basketball League of Canada, including winning a championship while with Halifax.

College career
He played college basketball for San Diego State under coach Steve Fisher. In 2009, it was alleged that White received improper academic assistance. However, the SDSU athletic department determined there was not sufficient evidence and the case was dropped.

In his senior season, he posted 21 points and 12 rebounds in the Mountain West Conference championship game versus BYU. In the NCAA Tournament, White had 16 points and 13 rebounds in a crucial overtime victory over Temple, shooting 8-for-15. "Billy's performance has definitely been a boost to this team, especially to the team's confidence," teammate D. J. Gay said. "…You couldn't ask for a better time for him to peak like this." As a senior, White started 36 games, averaging 10.3 points, 4.4 rebounds, 1.6 assists, 1.05 steals and 26.6 minutes per game. He shot 56.2 percent from the floor, 34.6 percent from behind the arc and 73.2 percent from the free throw line. He was a Mountain West Conference All-Tournament Team selection and was an All-MWC honorable mention selection for the third straight season. For his career, White scored a total of 1,294 points and finished first in Aztec history in games started (124).

Professional career
White went undrafted in the 2011 NBA Draft, but signed with the Iowa Energy of the NBA D-League on December 8, 2011. On December 15, he was signed by the Miami Heat, though he never played with them. He played professionally in Greece and Mexico. For the 2014–15 season, White played for Elitzur Ramla B.C. of the Israeli league, posting averages of 21.3 points, 8.6 rebounds, and 2.1 assists per game.

In November 2015, White was signed by the Halifax Hurricanes of the National Basketball League of Canada. On June 14, 2016, the Hurricanes won the 2016 NBL Canada Finals over the London Lightning, 4–3. In 52 NBL Canada games, White averaged 11.5 points, 4.8 rebounds and 1.1 assists per game. He signed with the Cypriot team Apollon Limassol BC in September 2016.

White re-joined the Halifax Hurricanes, and in 2018 was named to the First Team All-NBLC. On August 14, 2018, White's signing rights were traded to the Moncton Magic of the NBL Canada in exchange for those of Terry Thomas. Two days later, he was officially signed by the Magic. In the 2018-19 season, White averaged 17.3 points, 6.7 rebounds, and 3.5 assists per game. He was named to the All-NBLC Second Team. White was named league MVP in 2020, after averaging 18.9 points, 6.7 rebounds, and 2.7 assists per game.

In 2021, he played for the San Diego Guardians, a member of The Basketball League (TBL). He then joined Hebraica Macabi in Uruguay for the 2021–22 season.

The Basketball Tournament
Billy White played for Team CitiTeam Blazers in the 2018 edition of The Basketball Tournament. In two games, he averaged 2.0 points per game and 4.5 rebounds per game on 67 percent shooting. CitiTeam Blazers made it to the Second Round before falling to Team Challenge ALS.

References

External links 
Billy White on Twitter
Billy White at RealGM
Eurobasket profile

1989 births
Living people
American expatriate basketball people in Canada
American expatriate basketball people in Cyprus
American expatriate basketball people in Greece
American expatriate basketball people in Israel
American expatriate basketball people in Mexico
American men's basketball players
Apollon Limassol BC players
Basketball players from Nevada
Fuerza Regia de Monterrey players
Halifax Hurricanes players
Iowa Energy players
Moncton Magic players
Ostioneros de Guaymas (basketball) players
Rethymno B.C. players
San Diego State Aztecs men's basketball players
Sportspeople from Las Vegas
Power forwards (basketball)